Uarbryichthys is a genus of primitive ginglymodian ray-finned fish from fossil beds near the Talbragar River Bed.  The various species were lake-dwelling fish that lived during the Upper Jurassic of Australia, and are closely related to the macrosemiids.  The living animal would have had a superficial resemblance to a very small porgie, scup, or sea bream, but with a heterocercal tail fin.

References

External links
Paleobiology Database Entry

Prehistoric ray-finned fish genera
Jurassic bony fish
Prehistoric fish of Australia
Macrosemiiformes